The Isla de San Martín is an island located in Argentina's Iguazu River, within the Iguazu Falls in Misiones Province. The island spans the 3 levels that form the falls, but only the lower and middle levels are open to visitors. The island can only be reached in small boats, unless the river is below the minimum level. Once on the island, one must climb 190 steps through three different pathways that lead to a balcony with panoramic views.

Animal life
Isla de San Martín has a significant population of vultures.

See also
 Garganta del Diablo - The Devil's Throat, an  waterfall with the largest flow of Iguazu Falls (Spanish Wikipedia)

References

 Rafferty, John P. (2011). Rivers and Streams. The Rosen Publishing Group. p. 54. 

River islands of Argentina